FinecoBank S.p.A., known as FinecoBank or just Fineco is an Italian bank that specializes in online brokerage. Launched in 1999 with its Fineco Online service for retail traders, Fineco became a listed company in 2014 and has been independent from UniCredit banking group since 2019.

FinecoBank is a constituent of FTSE MIB (since 2016), the blue chip index of the Borsa Italiana.  Since 2015 it has over a million customers in Italy, where its role has been compared to that of Schwab in USA.

History

Predecessors 
The predecessor of Fineco was a financial institution known as GI-FIN S.r.l. in 1982 and then GI-FIN S.p.A. from October 1982. In 1983, the institution was incorporated as Istituto per le Cessioni del Quinto S.p.A. (ICQ), which later known as Novara ICQ S.p.A. and then ICQ Banca Cisalpina S.p.A.. ICQ Banca Cisalpina was a subsidiary of Banca Popolare di Novara (BP Novara). In 1990–91, BP Novara owned 51.21% shares of ICQ Banca Cisalpina. ICQ Banca Cisalpina was also a listed company, which was delisted in 1996 by its new owner Banca Popolare di Brescia (Bipop).

In 1999, Bipop merged with Cassa di Risparmio di Reggio Emilia (Carire) to form Bipop Carire. As of 1990, Banca Popolare di Brescia also partially owned the namesakes Fin-Eco Leasing (33.33%) and Fin-Eco Factoring (30%). As of 1994, Bipop owned the aforementioned companies via an intermediate holding company Fin-Eco Holding. The Holding also owned another subsidiary Fin-Eco SIM. Bipop also attempted to acquire another namesake Cisalpina Gestioni in 1994.

After the 1999 merger, the banking group re-organized ICQ Banca Cisalpina as well as Fin-Eco Leasing and Fin-Eco Factoring.

FinecoBank
ICQ Banca Cisalpina was renamed to "Fin-Eco Banca ICQ S.p.A." (Banca Fin-Eco in short) in 1999, which was considered as the launch date of the current Fineco. In 2002, Bipop Carire and Fineco became part of Capitalia banking group. In 2007, Capitalia was absorbed into UniCredit banking group, while Fineco was kept as a separate subsidiary.

In 2014 FinecoBank started its initial public offering. In 2016 UniCredit sold a further 30% shares to public market. In May 2019, UniCredit sold another 17% shares of FinecoBank. As UniCredit owned 18% shares of FinecoBank after the transaction, FinecoBank is no longer an associate company of UniCredit.

In 2020, Fineco decided to spend 7 million euros on a marketing campaign to grow its services in UK, whose launch was authorised earlier in the same year.

FinecoBank Banca Fineco serves customers in the United Kingdom and Italy.

UniCredit sold its remaining stake in FinecoBank in 2019.

References

External links
  
FinecoBank on Facebook
FinecoBank on LinkedIn

Banks of Italy
UniCredit Group
Capitalia Group
Companies listed on the Borsa Italiana
Italian companies established in 1999
Banks established in 1999
Online financial services companies of Italy
Online financial services companies of the United Kingdom
Online brokerages